Bhavani Thuraisingham is the Louis A. Beecherl, Jr. Distinguished Professor of computer science and the executive director of the Cyber Security Research and Education Institute at the University of Texas at Dallas. She is a visiting senior research fellow in the Department of Informatics at Kings College University of London and a 2017–2018 Cyber Security Policy Fellow at New America.

Education 
Thuraisingham received a B.Sc. in pure mathematics, applied mathematics, and physics from the University of Ceylon in 1975. She received an M.Sc. in mathematical logic and foundations of computer science from the University of Bristol and an M.S. in computer science from the University of Minnesota in 1977 and 1984 respectively. She earned a Ph.D. in the theory of computation and computability theory from the University of Wales, Swansea in 1979 and a Doctor of Engineering at the University of Bristol in 2011.

Career
Thuraisingham has worked in commercial industry for Honeywell, Federally Funded Research and Development Center (MITRE), Government (NSF) and Academia. She conducts research in cyber security and specializes in applying data analytics for cyber security.

Awards and honors
 IEEE Fellow, 2003
 IEEE Computer Society 1997 Technical Achievement Award
 AAAS Fellow, 2003
 British Computer Society Fellow, 2005
 ACM SIGSAC Outstanding Contributions Award, 2010
 ACM Distinguished Scientist, 2010
 ACM Fellow, 2018

References

Living people
Fellows of the Association for Computing Machinery
Fellow Members of the IEEE
University of Texas at Dallas faculty
Sri Lankan computer scientists
1955 births